This is a round-up of the 2009 Sligo Intermediate Football Championship. Geevagh were crowned champions for the fifth time, defeating Bunninadden. Both finalists were relegated to Senior in 2008.

Group stages

The Championship was contested by 13 teams, divided into four groups. The top two sides in each group advanced to the quarter-finals, with the remaining sides in each group facing the Relegation playoffs to retain Intermediate status for 2009, as the restructuring of the Championships got under way.

Group A

Group B

Group C

Group D

Quarter finals

Semi-finals

Sligo Intermediate Football Championship Final

Relegation

As part of the championship revamp, three teams were to be relegated to Junior A. As St. Mary's did not field in the competition they were automatically relegated.
The teams in pink are those relegated.

Sligo Intermediate Football Championship
Sligo Intermediate Football Championship